Cherrydale is a neighborhood in northern Arlington, Virginia. It is centered on the intersection known as the Five Points consisting of Quincy Street, Military Road, and Old Dominion Road being bisected by Lee Highway (U.S. Route 29). Located in the community is Dorothy Hamm Middle School. One of the oldest nonresidential structures in the community is the Cherrydale Volunteer Fire House, built in 1919 to serve as the home of the Cherrydale Volunteer Fire Department. The department supplements the career staff who operate from the Arlington County Fire Department's Station 3, now located west of the Five Points intersection.

History

In 1893, a branch post office at Lee Highway and Pollard Street was named Cherrydale, with reference to Dorsey Donaldson's large cherry orchard in back of the present firehouse. Quincy Street was then known as Cherry Valley Road. Settlement in this area began after the Civil War and was stimulated in 1906 by the establishment of The Great Falls and Old Dominion Railway Line. Abandoned in 1935, the track bed became Old Dominion Drive.  Military Road was cut through broken and densely wooded country by Army Engineers in 1861 to connect the isolated defensive works at Chain Bridge (Forts Marcy and Ethan Allen) with the Arlington Line.

References

Cherrydale Library

External links 
Cherrydale Citizens Association
Cherrydale Housing Market Trends
Our Neighborhoods - Cherrydale Arlington County Page

Neighborhoods in Arlington County, Virginia